On Becoming a God in Central Florida is an American dark comedy television series created by Robert Funke and Matt Lutsky that premiered on Showtime on August 25, 2019. The series stars Kirsten Dunst and is set in the early 1990s.

In September 2019, the series was renewed for a second season. However, in October 2020, the renewal decision was reversed and the series was canceled after one season due to the COVID-19 pandemic.

Plot
Krystal Stubbs is a minimum-wage-earning water park employee in Greater Orlando who schemes her way up the ranks of Founders American Merchandise, a cultish, flag-waving, multi-billion-dollar multi-level marketing pyramid scheme that drove her family to ruin.

Cast and characters

Main
 Kirsten Dunst as Krystal Stubbs
 Théodore Pellerin as Cody Bonar
 Mel Rodriguez as Ernie Gomes
 Beth Ditto as Bets Gomes
 Ted Levine as Obie Garbeau II

Recurring
 Usman Ally as Stan Van Grundegaard
 Eric Allan Kramer as Carroll Wilkes
 Julie Benz as Carole Wilkes
 Billy Slaughter as Kissinger Haight
 Josh Fadem as Pat Stanley
 Da'Vine Joy Randolph as Rhonda
 Cooper Jack Rubin as Harold Gomes
 John Earl Jelks as Dr. Judd Waltrip
 Melissa De Sousa as Mirta Herrera
 Kevin J. O'Connor as Roger Penland
 Sharon Lawrence as Louise Garbeau
 Shari Headley as Harmony
 Geoffrey Owens as Pastor Steve

Guest
 Alexander Skarsgård as Travis Stubbs
 Mary Steenburgen as Ellen Joy Bonar
 David Paymer as Buck Bridges

Episodes

Production

Development
On January 6, 2017, it was reported that AMC was developing the production. The series was created by Robert Funke and Matt Lutsky who also wrote the pilot episode and were set to executive produce for the series alongside Kirsten Dunst, Yorgos Lanthimos, George Clooney, and Grant Heslov. Lanthimos was also set to direct. Production companies involved with the series were expected to include Smokehouse Pictures, TriStar Television, and AMC Studios.

On June 25, 2018, it was announced that the production had moved to YouTube Premium, which had given it a series order for a first season consisting of 10 episodes. It was further reported that Esta Spalding and Charlie McDowell had joined the series as executive producers. Spaulding is also set to serve as showrunner and McDowell is set to direct, replacing Lanthimos as executive producer and director.

On June 17, 2019, it was announced that Showtime, which had acquired the series from TriStar, would air the series instead of YouTube and that it would premiere on August 25, 2019.

On September 26, 2019, Showtime renewed the series for a second season. However, on October 7, 2020, Showtime reversed the renewal and canceled the series, stating that "the [COVID-19 pandemic] has continued to challenge schedules across the board, and although we have made every effort to reunite the cast and crew for a second season, that has become untenable."

Casting
Alongside the initial development announcement, it was confirmed that Kirsten Dunst would star in the series. On August 28, 2018, it was announced that Théodore Pellerin had been cast in a lead role. On September 14, 2018, it was reported that Ted Levine, Mel Rodriguez, and Beth Ditto had joined the cast in series regular roles and that Usman Ally would appear on a recurring basis. On October 5, 2018, it was announced that Julie Benz had joined the cast in a recurring capacity. On November 28, 2018, it was reported that Melissa De Sousa would appear in a recurring role.

Filming
Principal photography for the series commenced in October 2018 in New Orleans, Louisiana. On October 8, 2018, filming took place in Westwego, Louisiana.

Reception

Critical response
On review aggregator Rotten Tomatoes, the series holds an approval rating of 85% based on 47 reviews, with an average rating of 7.29/10. The website's critical consensus reads, "Though it loses a bit of narrative steam, On Becoming a God in Central Florida proves a clever and absurd satire that will make you want to buy whatever Kirsten Dunst is selling." On Metacritic, it has a weighted average score of 76 out of 100, based on 22 critics, indicating "generally favorable reviews".

Accolades

References

External links
 
 

2010s American black comedy television series
2010s American comedy-drama television series
2010s American satirical television series
2019 American television series debuts
2019 American television series endings
English-language television shows
Fraud in television
Television series about organized crime
Showtime (TV network) original programming
Television productions cancelled due to the COVID-19 pandemic
Television series by Sony Pictures Television
Television series set in the 1990s
Television shows filmed in Louisiana
Television shows set in Orlando, Florida